Jakjeon Station is a subway station on Line 1 of the Incheon Subway located at Jakjeon-dong, Gyeyang-gu, Incheon, South Korea.

Overview
Jakjeon is a dense residential area with many apartment buildings.

Passengers
Because of its characteristics, many people enter and leave during rush hours. Besides, it roles as a traffic node in the northern area of Bupyeong station with Gyeongin Expressway.

Station layout

Exits

References

Seoul Metropolitan Subway stations
Metro stations in Incheon
Railway stations in South Korea opened in 1999
Gyeyang District